Charlie Heck (born November 20, 1996) is an American football offensive tackle for the Houston Texans of the National Football League (NFL). He played college football at North Carolina.

College career
Playing at Rockhurst High School, Heck committed to University of North Carolina as a tight end on November 30, 2014, choosing the Tar Heels over Indiana, Kansas, Kansas State and others.

After redshirting his freshman season, Heck started some games as a redshirt freshman before becoming a full-time starter during his sophomore season. Heck played at right tackle during his junior season and left tackle during his senior season. After his senior season, Heck participated in the 2020 Senior Bowl and the East-West Shrine Bowl.

Professional career
Heck was selected by the Houston Texans in the fourth round (126th overall) of the 2020 NFL Draft. The Texans traded up to select Heck.

Personal life
Charlie's father, Andy Heck, is the offensive line coach for the Kansas City Chiefs and a former college football All-American.  Charlie's brother, Jon Heck, also played offensive tackle for the University of North Carolina and currently serves as an assistant strength and conditioning coach for Carolina football.

References

External links
North Carolina bio

Living people
1996 births
American football offensive tackles
North Carolina Tar Heels football players
Players of American football from Kansas City, Missouri
Houston Texans players